FK Tatran Prachatice is a football club located in Prachatice, Czech Republic. The club played two seasons in the Czech 2. Liga. It currently plays in the South Bohemian Championship (Czech: Jihočeský přebor), which is in the fifth tier of the Czech football system.

Previous seasons
 2001/02: ČFL 2nd
 2002/03: ČFL 1st (promoted)
 2003/04: 2.Liga 13th
 2004/05: 2.Liga 15th (relegated)
 2005/06: ČFL 7th
 2006/07: ČFL 11th (relegated)
 2007/08: Divize A 8th
 2008/09: Divize A 3rd (relegated)
 2009/10: 5. liga (Jihočeský kraj) 7th
 2010/11: 5. liga (Jihočeský kraj) 9th
 2011/12: 5. liga (Jihočeský kraj) 11th
 2012/13: 5. liga (Jihočeský kraj) 2nd
 2013/14: 5. liga (Jihočeský kraj) 12th
 2014/15: 5. liga (Jihočeský kraj) 6th
 2015/16: 5. liga (Jihočeský kraj) 15th (relegated)
 2016/17: 1.A třída (Jihočeský kraj) 4th
 2017/18: 1.A třída (Jihočeský kraj) 9th
 2019/20: 1.A třída (Jihočeský kraj) 5th (cancelled)
 2020/21: 1.A třída (Jihočeský kraj) 11th (cancelled and promoted)
 2021/22: 5. liga (Jihočeský kraj) 4th

Notable former players
Luboš Pecka

David Horejš

Milan Nitrianský

Honours
Bohemian Football League (third tier)
 Champions 2002–03

References

External links
 Official website 

Football clubs in the Czech Republic
Association football clubs established in 1931
Prachatice District